Saponara (Sicilian: Sapunara) is a comune (municipality) in the Metropolitan City of Messina in the Italian region Sicily, located about  east of Palermo and about  west of Messina.

Saponara borders the following municipalities: Messina, Rometta, Villafranca Tirrena.

References

Cities and towns in Sicily